In Greek mythology, Asterion  (Greek: , gen.: , literally "starry")  or Asterius  may refer to the following figures:

 Asterion, one of the Potamoi.
 Asterius, one of the Giants.
 Asterion, an attendant of the starry-god Astraeus.
 Asterion or Asterius, king of Crete.
 Asterion or Asterius, name of the Minotaur.
 Asterion, son of Zeus and Idaea, a daughter of Minos.
 Asterius, son of Minos and Androgenia, a girl from the Cretan city of Phaestus. He was the commander of Cretans who joined the god Dionysus in his Indian War. Asterius never returned to his homeland but instead settled among the Colchians and named them Asterians. There Asterius fathered Miletus, Caunus, and Byblis.
 Asterius, a king of Anactoria (Miletus) and son of Anax, son of Gaia. He was a slain by the hero Miletus who named after himself the newly conquered lands.According to Pausanias, an island named after him was thought to be a burial of him that existed near the city of Milesians.
 Asterius, according to Hyginus one of the Sons of Aegyptus, who married Cleo, daughter of Danaus.
 Asterius, a prince of Pylos and son of King Neleus by Chloris, daughter of King Amphion of Orchomenus. He was the brother to Pero, Asterius, Pylaon, Deimachus, Eurybius, Epilaus, Evagoras, Phrasius, Eurymenes, Alastor, Nestor and Periclymenus. Asterius was slain along with his brothers, except Nestor, by Heracles when the hero took revenge on Neleus when the latter refused to cleanse Heracles of his blood-debt.
 Asterion or Asterius, an Argonaut from Peirasia in Thessaly. He was the son of Cometes and Antigona, daughter of King Pheres of Pherae.
 Asterius or Asterion, an Argonaut from the Achaean city of Pellene. He was the son of Hyperasius, son of Pelles, son of Phorbas. In two separate accounts, Asterius and his brother Amphion were called the children of Hypso while Hippasus was said to be their father.

Notes

References 
 Anonymous. The Orphic Argonautica, translated by Jason Colavito. Copyright 2011. Online version at the Topos Text Project.
 Apollodorus, The Library with an English Translation by Sir James George Frazer, F.B.A., F.R.S. in 2 Volumes, Cambridge, MA, Harvard University Press; London, William Heinemann Ltd. 1921. ISBN 0-674-99135-4. Online version at the Perseus Digital Library. Greek text available from the same website.
Gaius Julius Hyginus, Fabulae from The Myths of Hyginus translated and edited by Mary Grant. University of Kansas Publications in Humanistic Studies. Online version at the Topos Text Project.
 Gaius Valerius Flaccus, Argonautica translated by Mozley, J H. Loeb Classical Library Volume 286. Cambridge, MA, Harvard University Press; London, William Heinemann Ltd. 1928. Online version at theio.com.
 Gaius Valerius Flaccus, Argonauticon. Otto Kramer. Leipzig. Teubner. 1913. Latin text available at the Perseus Digital Library.
 Homer, The Iliad with an English Translation by A.T. Murray, Ph.D. in two volumes. Cambridge, MA., Harvard University Press; London, William Heinemann, Ltd. 1924. Online version at the Perseus Digital Library.
 Homer, Homeri Opera in five volumes. Oxford, Oxford University Press. 1920. Greek text available at the Perseus Digital Library.
 Nonnus of Panopolis, Dionysiaca translated by William Henry Denham Rouse (1863-1950), from the Loeb Classical Library, Cambridge, MA, Harvard University Press, 1940.  Online version at the Topos Text Project.
 Nonnus of Panopolis, Dionysiaca. 3 Vols. W.H.D. Rouse. Cambridge, MA., Harvard University Press; London, William Heinemann, Ltd. 1940–1942. Greek text available at the Perseus Digital Library.
 Pausanias, Description of Greece with an English Translation by W.H.S. Jones, Litt.D., and H.A. Ormerod, M.A., in 4 Volumes. Cambridge, MA, Harvard University Press; London, William Heinemann Ltd. 1918. . Online version at the Perseus Digital Library
 Pausanias, Graeciae Descriptio. 3 vols. Leipzig, Teubner. 1903.  Greek text available at the Perseus Digital Library.

Argonauts
Neleides
Characters in the Argonautica
Achaean characters in Greek mythology
Pylian characters in Greek mythology
Thessalian characters in Greek mythology